Ultimate Blue is the sixth compilation album to be released by British boy band Blue, released on 14 May 2012 in promotion of their fourth studio album, Roulette. The album includes all of the band's back catalogue of singles, bar "Signed, Sealed, Delivered, I'm Yours", as the band deemed it their least favourite single of all, as well as a number of popular album tracks, B-sides, as well as one or two tracks previously unreleased in the United Kingdom, such as "The Gift", which was only previously available in Japan, and "Welcome to the Show", which was only previously available on the European release 4Ever Blue. The album is one of a number of releases in the Ultimate series, with other artists such as Atomic Kitten and East 17 also issuing albums under the Music Club Deluxe label.

Track listing

Charts

Release history

References

Blue (English band) compilation albums
2012 compilation albums

id:The Collection (album Blue)
it:The Collection (Blue)